Randall Thompson (born June 14, 1964 in Halifax, Nova Scotia) is a retired boxer from Canada, who competed in the middleweight (< 75 kg) division at the 1996 Summer Olympics in Atlanta, Georgia. There he was stopped in the first round by Ireland's Brian Magee.

External links
 Canadian Olympic Committee

1964 births
Boxers at the 1996 Summer Olympics
Living people
Middleweight boxers
Olympic boxers of Canada
Sportspeople from Halifax, Nova Scotia
Canadian male boxers
Black Canadian boxers
Black Nova Scotians